Polyembryoma is a rare, very aggressive form of germ cell tumor usually found in the ovaries. Polyembryoma has features of both yolk sac tumour and undifferentiated teratoma/embryonal carcinoma, with a characteristic finding of embryoid bodies lying in a loose mesenchymal stroma.

It has been found in association with Klinefelter syndrome.

References

External links 

Germ cell neoplasia
Gynaecological neoplasia